The 1942 All-Ireland Senior Hurling Championship Final was the 55th All-Ireland Final and the culmination of the 1942 All-Ireland Senior Hurling Championship, an inter-county hurling tournament for the top teams in Ireland. The match was held at Croke Park, Dublin, on 6 September 1942, between Cork and Dublin. The Leinster champions lost to their Munster opponents on a score line of 2–14 to 3–4.

Match details

1
All-Ireland Senior Hurling Championship Finals
Cork county hurling team matches
Dublin GAA matches
All-Ireland Senior Hurling Championship Final
All-Ireland Senior Hurling Championship Final
All-Ireland Senior Hurling Championship Final, 1942